The Glory class is a series of 8 container ships currently operated by COSCO SHIPPING Lines and built by Hyundai Heavy Industries in South Korea. The ships have a maximum theoretical capacity of 13,114 TEU.

The ships were ordered in 2007 by Seaspan Corporation for a 12-year charter to COSCO Container Lines. The first ship was delivered in 2011.

List of ships

See also 

 COSCO Belgium-class container ship

References 

Container ship classes
Ships built by Hyundai Heavy Industries Group
Ships of COSCO Shipping